Fiskenes is a village in Andøy Municipality in Nordland county, Norway. The village is located on the northeastern part of the island of Andøya, along the Andfjorden. The population is approximately 50 people.

References

Andøy
Villages in Nordland
Populated places of Arctic Norway